Suero Rodríguez (died 23 April 1206) was the fifth grand master of the Order of Santiago from 1204 until his death.

Suero was a Galician, the son of Rodrigo Velázquez. He may have been a member of the confraternity of Cáceres organized by Pedro Fernández de Castro, which became the Order of Santiago in 1170.

Suero succeeded Gonzalo Rodríguez upon the latter's resignation in 1204. During his two years as master, Pope Innocent III confirmed the orders rule. Alfonso also gave to the  during Suero's tenure. Because Alfonso was at peace with the Almohads, Suero sent his knights to Aragon to fight the Almohads.

Older sources sometimes have Suero resigning the mastership in 1205, but he held it until his death the following year. He was succeeded by Fernando González de Marañón.

References

12th-century births
1206 deaths
Grand Masters of the Order of Santiago